Paso de los Libres Airport  is an international airport serving Paso de los Libres, a town on the Uruguay River in Corrientes Province, Argentina.

The Paso De Los Libres non-directional beacon (Ident: LIB) is located on the field.

See also

Transport in Argentina
List of airports in Argentina

References

External links
OpenStreetMap - Paso de los Libres Airport

Airports in Argentina